Jessie Margaret Murray (9 February 1867 – 25 September 1920) was a British psychoanalyst and suffragette. Born in India, she moved to the UK when she was 13. She undertook studies in medicine with the College of Preceptors and Worshipful Society of Apothecaries and at the University of Durham and University College London; she also attended the lectures of the French psychologist Pierre Janet at the Collège de France, Paris.

Murray was a member of the Women's Freedom League and Women's Tax Resistance League, two organisations that took direct action in their campaign for women's suffrage. In 1910 she and the journalist Henry Brailsford took statements from the suffragettes who had been mistreated during the Black Friday demonstrations in November that year. Their published memorandum was presented to the Home Office, along with a formal request for a public inquiry; the Home Secretary, Winston Churchill, refused to set one up.

After practicing medicine from 1909, Murray and her close friend Julia Turner opened the Medico-Psychological Clinic in 1913, a pioneering entity that provided psychological evaluation and treatment, affordable for middle-class families. Several of the staff who worked and trained at the clinic became leading psychoanalysts. Murray was awarded an MD by the University of Durham in 1919. Shortly afterwards she was diagnosed with ovarian cancer; she died in September 1920, aged 53.

Early life, education and professional training: 1867–1910

Jessie Margaret Murray was born in Hazaribagh, British India on 9 February 1867 to Hugh Hildyard, a lieutenant of the Royal Artillery, and Frances Jane Murray. The couple also had two younger daughters while in India, Mary Ethel and Edith May. In about 1880 Frances Murray and her children travelled to Edinburgh, and by 1891 they were living in London. Five years later the family was living in Bayswater, West London, when Hugh, then a retired colonel, died.

In 1898 Murray met Julia Turner, who was completing an undergraduate degree in classics at University College London. The two formed a close friendship; Elizabeth Valentine, Murray's biographer, considers the relationship was an "intimate friendship ... that showed many of the signs of a life partnership". Turner gave Murray private tuition, and she passed the first stage examinations of the College of Preceptors in 1899. In February 1900 she began studying at the London School of Medicine for Women and then enrolled as student at the College of Medicine, Newcastle. In June 1908 she passed her examinations to become a Licentiate in Medicine and Surgery of the Worshipful Society of Apothecaries. The following year she was granted the degree of Bachelor of Medicine, Bachelor of Surgery at the University of Durham; her study also included the field of psychological medicine. Sometime later Murray also attended the lectures of the French psychologist Pierre Janet at the Collège de France, Paris.

Women's suffrage activism

Murray was a member of the Women's Freedom League, a militant organisation for women's suffrage, founded in 1907, which eschewed violence in favour of non-violent tactics; Turner was also a member, while Turner's two sisters were members of the Women's Social and Political Union.

On Black Friday—18 November 1910—a suffragette demonstration of 300 women marchers was treated with violence, some of it sexual, by the Metropolitan Police and bystanders. Murray and the journalist Henry Brailsford collected 135 statements from demonstrators, nearly all of which described acts of violence against the women; 29 of the statements also included details of violence that included sexual indecency. Their findings were published and, in February 1911, the memorandum was presented to the Home Office, along with a formal request for a public inquiry. The Home Secretary, Winston Churchill, refused to set one up.

Murray was a member of the Women's Tax Resistance League, a direct action organisation that used tax resistance to protest the lack of vote. Murray hosted group meetings at her house and, in 1911, had property seized by bailiffs for non-payment of her taxes. She wrote on her demand "I, a member of the Tax Resistance League, hereby declare that I have conscientious objections to paying King's taxes so long as women are denied the suffrage. I maintain that taxation without representation is unconstitutional." Her debts were covered by the sale of a sideboard and chairs, although she refused to allow her property to be purchased back by her friends. In 1913 Murray donated ten shillings, sixpence to the Tax League; such funds were often used by the League to buy back seized property.

Medico-Psychological Clinic

From 1912 to 1914 Murray worked as a consulting physician at the Quinton Polyclinic for treatment by isotonised seawater. In 1913, while Murray was still consulting at the Polyclinic, she and Turner established the Medico-Psychological Clinic at 14 Endsleigh Street, where they both lived. Initially the clinic operated informally, opening only three afternoons a week, offering their services to those who could not afford an alternative; one of the clinic's aims was to provide treatment that could be afforded by middle-class patients.

The clinic was pioneering, according to The Institute of Psychoanalysis. The practice soon grew and in July 1914 the clinic moved to its own premises at 30 Brunswick Square, London. From July 1915 the clinic began a training programme for psychotherapists—the Society for the Study of Orthopsychics. Several of the staff who worked and studied there later became leading psychoanalysts, including James Glover, Susan Isaacs, Sylvia Payne, Marjorie Brierley and Ella Freeman Sharpe.

Murray joined many of the professional networks associated with her field, and became a member of the British Medical Association, the Association of Registered Medical Women, the Psycho-Medical Society, the Medico-Psychological Association, the Royal Society of Medicine, the Society for Psychical Research, the British Society for the Study of Sex Psychology, the British Association for the Advancement of Science (BAAS) and the Psychological Society.

Final years
In 1915 Murray met Marie Stopes at a BAAS meeting in Manchester, where both women presented papers. The two corresponded and attended the same medical meetings as one another. In 1918 Stopes published her book Married Love, A New Contribution to the Solution of Sex Difficulties; Murray wrote the preface.

In July 1919 Murray was awarded an MD by the University of Durham. Her thesis was "Nervous Functional Diseases from the Point of View of Modern Clinical Psychology", which, according to Valentine, "discussed the value of psychological discoveries in the treatment and prevention of nervous and mental diseases".

Soon after she was awarded her MD, Murray was diagnosed with ovarian cancer, and retired from the clinic. She wrote her will in July 1919, leaving her estate to Turner, who was also named as the executrix. Murray died on 25 September 1920, aged 53; she was cremated, and her ashes buried in her mother's grave in Highgate Cemetery. Her obituary in The British Medical Journal described her as "a brilliant and many-sided personality".

Notes and references

Notes

References

Sources

 
 
 
 
 
 
 
 
 
 

1867 births
1961 deaths
20th-century English medical doctors
British women's rights activists
English feminists
British women psychiatrists
British psychoanalysts
English women medical doctors
British suffragists
20th-century women physicians
Alumni of Durham University College of Medicine